Südliches Anhalt ("Southern Anhalt") is a town in the district of Anhalt-Bitterfeld, in Saxony-Anhalt, Germany. It was formed on 1 January 2010 by the merger of the former municipalities Edderitz, Fraßdorf, Glauzig, Großbadegast, Hinsdorf, Libehna, Maasdorf, Meilendorf, Prosigk, Quellendorf, Radegast, Reupzig, Riesdorf, Scheuder, Trebbichau an der Fuhne, Weißandt-Gölzau, Wieskau and Zehbitz. On 1 September 2010 the former municipalities Gröbzig, Görzig and Piethen joined the town.

Geography 
The town Südliches Anhalt consists of the following Ortschaften or municipal divisions:

Edderitz
Fraßdorf
Glauzig
Görzig
Gröbzig
Großbadegast
Hinsdorf
Libehna
Maasdorf
Meilendorf
Piethen
Prosigk
Quellendorf
Radegast
Reinsdorf
Reupzig
Riesdorf
Scheuder
Trebbichau an der Fuhne
Weißandt-Gölzau
Werdershausen
Wieskau
Wörbzig
Zehbitz

References

 
Anhalt-Bitterfeld